The Boston String Quartet  has been an accomplished creative leader in contemporary classical music in New England since 2005. The quartet is a high-energy string ensemble, that is continually "exploring different ways of sparking musical interest".  Past collaborators include John Mayer, the Boston Ballet, and Fionnuala Gill. The quartet has performed in Carnegie Hall, the Los Angeles Music Awards, Boston Symphony Hall, PBS, and for former president George W. Bush. CD releases are under the Parma and Navona labels.

Members 
Chen Lin, viola
Christina Stripling, cello
Christopher Vuk, violin
Angel Valchinov, violin

References

External links 
http://www.bostonstringquartet.com/
http://www.boston.com/ae/music/articles/2008/05/07/two_violinists_a_violist_and_a_cellist_walk_into_a_concert_hall/
https://web.archive.org/web/20120406224020/http://www.mvtimes.com/marthas-vineyard/article.php?id=7211
http://www.pjstar.com/news/x90197866/Morton-orchestra-to-jam-with-pros

American string quartets
Musical groups from Boston
Musical groups established in 2005